Saskatoon Light & Power is a utility that provides electrical services within the city of Saskatoon, Saskatchewan, Canada. The utility is owned by the City of Saskatoon. The company was founded in 1906. Electrical service in the rest of Saskatoon, and the rest  of Saskatchewan, is provided by the provincial utility SaskPower, which also supplies all the electricity that Saskatoon Light & Power uses.

References

External links
 

Electric power companies of Canada
Companies based in Saskatoon
1906 establishments in Saskatchewan
Companies owned by municipalities of Canada
Public utilities established in 1906